Malyshev Volodymyr Stepanovych — colonel-general of militia of Ukraine, People's deputy of Ukraine of the V-th, VI-th, VII-th convocations (2006-2014), Doctor of Law (2013), Honored Lawyer of Ukraine (1997).
Honored citizen of Alexander district, Donetsk region (decision number 4 / 35-235 Alexander Regional Council of 21.12.2005), Philanthropist, benefactor.

Born on 26 July 1950 in Stalino, which was renamed in 1961 in Donetsk.

His father, Malyshev Stepan Kuzmich (21 October 1904) - vet, came through the war and all his life worked at the Donetsk metallurgical plant in an open-heart plant as smelter. Died 29 March 1984.

His mother, Malysheva Galyna Dmytrivna (13 July 1904) - housewife. Died 19 July 1990.
Wife: Malysheva (maiden name - Prylutska) Olena Afonivna, 30 May 1951.

Has two daughters Julia and Natalia, grandchildren Timur (in Orthodoxy Tikhon), Bogdan and Lada (in Orthodoxy Liya).

Education 
1957-1965 - School 44, Lenin district, Donetsk

1965-1967 - School 45, Lenin district, Donetsk

Class teacher - Vira Terentiivna Udovychenko,

In 1969 he entered the evening department of Donetsk Metallurgical College, which he graduated in 1974, specialty "technician-metallurgist."

From 1975 to 1980 he studied at the Kharkiv Law Institute, specialty "Law"; qualification: lawyer.

From 1989 to 1991 he studied at the Academy of MIA USSR, specialty "Organization Management in Law Enforcement", qualification: lawyer-organizer.

Working experience 
From 1967 to 1969 - a mechanic in a metal structures shop of Donetsk Metallurgical Plant.

1971-1975 - Senior Controller of Technical quality department of open-heart plant in Donetsk Metallurgical Plant.

From March 2005 to May 2006 held the position of Director of Security Department in АТ «System Capital Management».

Service in the fighting forces and protection enforcement authorities 
From November 1969 to November 1971 service in the Group of Soviet Forces in Germany.

According to the decree of CC CPSU and the USSR Council of Ministers from 19 November 1968 about fundamentally new order of manning the militia by sending for the militia service the best representatives of labor assets with previous discussion of candidates at a meeting of party and trade union organizations and the Regulations of the Soviet militia, entered into force on 1 July 1973, was sent to work in the Soviet police authorities.

May 1975 - June 1976 district militia officer of Kuybyshevsk district department of internal affairs of Donetsk. First teacher - Dmytro Egorovych Balychevcev.

June 1976 - October 1978 - Inspector of preventive service OCD of the Kuibyshev district police station in Donetsk

October 1978 - February 1980 - investigator of the investigation department of the Kuibyshev district police station in Donetsk

February 1980 - November 1983 - Deputy Head of the Kuibyshev district police station in Donetsk

November 1983 - February 1984 - Acting Head of the Kalininsk district police department in Donetsk

February 1984 - April 1984 - Head of the Kalininsk district police department in Donetsk

April 1984 - March 1988 - Head of the Kuibyshev district police station in Donetsk

March 1988 - August 1989 - deputy chief of the police department of Donetsk City Executive Committee

August 1989 - January 1991 - student of the Academy MIA USSR

January 1991 - March 1994 - Head of the Kalininsk district police department in Donetsk

April 1994 - dismissed from the Interior Ministry of Ukraine due to election as a judge of Kalinin district court of Donetsk

April 1994 - May 1995 Judge of the Kalinin district court of Donetsk

May 1995-June 1998 - Deputy Head of the Department - Head of the Investigation Department of Ministry of Internal Affairs of Ukraine in Donetsk region

June 1998-May 2000 - First Deputy Head, Head of UBOZ Ministry of Internal Affairs of Ukraine in Donetsk region.

May 2000-January 2005 - Head of Ministry of Internal Affairs of Ukraine in Donetsk region.

Policy 
Deputy of Donetsk regional council (March 2002-April 2006), member of the Commission on Economic Policy, Budget and Finance

June 2006-November 2007 - people's deputy of the Verkhovna Rada of Ukraine of 5th convocation (Party of Regions, No. 64 in the list). Member of the Committee on Legislative Support of Law Enforcement (from July, 2006)

Since November 2007 - people's deputy of the Verkhovna Rada of Ukraine of the 6th convocation (Party of Regions, No. 64 in the list) Committee on Legislative Support of Law Enforcement (since December 2007), Chairman of the Subcommittee on Legislative Support and parliamentary control over the activity of the Interior and other law enforcement agencies (since January 2008).

From November 2012 to 27 November 2014 - people's deputy of the Verkhovna Rada of Ukraine of the 7-th convocation (No.62 in the party list of the Party of Regions of Ukraine) Committee on Legislative Support of Law Enforcement (since December 2007), Chairman of the Subcommittee on Legislative Support and parliamentary control over the activity of law enforcement Affairs and other law enforcement agencies.

Legislative activity

Author of the laws of Ukraine 
•"On amendments to the Criminal Code of Ukraine about the introduction of responsibility for illegal actions against toxic or potent drugs" was passed on 4 April 2007. The main purpose of the law is the introduction of criminal liability for illegal actions with toxic and potent drugs, including toxic drug Tramadol.

•"On Amendments to the Code of Ukraine on Administrative Offences (regarding the qualifications crimes and offenses)", adopted as a Law of Ukraine on 4 June 2009.  The main goal is reducing the minimum value of the property for theft of which comes criminal responsibility.

•"On Amendments to the Law of Ukraine "On Police" for improving the social protection of police officers", adopted on 18 March 2009. The purpose of this law is to preserve the achieved level of social protection of police officers, preventing attempts to restructure health care institutions, currently subject to the Interior Ministry of Ukraine, which would threaten their squandering and loss.

•"On Amendments to Articles 155, 156 of the Criminal Code of Ukraine (concerning the corruption of minors)", adopted on 25 September 2008.

•"On Amendments to Articles 304 and 323 of the Criminal Code of Ukraine (concerning the strengthening of accountability for crimes against the family and children)", was adopted on 1 October 2008.

•"On Amendments to the Law of Ukraine "On amnesty in Ukraine"", adopted on 2 June 2011. Is effective as of 1 January 2012. Adoption of the Law in the new version really contributed to strengthening humanitarian principles in society and at the same time makes it impossible to apply amnesty to persons convicted of committing serious or especially serious crimes.

Author of the legislations of Ukraine 
•"On Amendments to Certain Legislative Acts of Ukraine regarding the parliamentary control of law enforcement", registered on 2 February 2009, No. 3685.

•On Amendments to the Code of Ukraine on Administrative Offences (to protect the child), registered on 19 November 2010, No. 7390

•On making amendments and additions to Criminal and Criminal Procedural Codes of Ukraine (concerning the protection of the child from trafficking and exploitation), registered on 19 November 2010, No. 7391

• On Amendments to Law of Ukraine "On Police" on improving staffing of the internal affairs bodies, registered on 11 January 2011.

Co-author of the legislations of Ukraine 
•"On the system of pre-trial investigation in Ukraine"

•"On Amendments to Article 9 of the Disciplinary Statute of the internal affairs"

•"On Amendments to the Law of Ukraine On application of Amnesty in Ukraine" 2 June 2011.

•"On the moratorium on adoptions by foreigners and stateless the children of citizens of Ukraine."

•"On security activity".

•On Amendments to the Law of Ukraine "Regulations of the Verkhovna Rada of Ukraine" regarding improvement of the opening of the plenary meetings and many others.

Creative contribution 
Co-author of the books: 
 "History of Donetsk police" (2000)
 "The Anatomy of Evil" (2001)
 "Career of victim" (2002)
 "The Legend of Donetsk football" (2006)

Interests 
Motto: "The policeman should be comprehensively sophisticated, educated man."

Theatre, music. Especially symphonic, organ music.

Football. Child's team "Shakhtar" player. Because of the injury was forced to leave.

Religious activities and charity 
Orthodox, Ukrainian Orthodox Church

His path to God found due to schema-archimandrite Zosyma (Sokurov), which considers his confessarius. The words of the great staretz: "Life is short. Hasten to do good" became the credo for Volodymyr Stepanovych Malyshev. On 20 December 2000 on the initiative of Malyshev Volodymyr Stepanovych was laid down and consecrated the stone for the opening of the church of St. Martyr John the Warrior and on 22 August 2001 church was consecrated by Metropolitan of Donetsk and Mariupol Ilarion. This is a tribute to those policemen who died at the hands of criminals.

In 2007 Malyshev Volodymyr Stepanovych initiated and financed the opening of Holy Transfiguration Church in the Verkhovna Rada of Ukraine, opened on 19 January 2008 and consecrated by His Beatitude Metropolitan of Kyiv and All Ukraine Volodymyr. Senior priest - archpriest Victor Yatsenko.

In 2007, Malyshev Volodymyr Stepanovych paid at his own expense creation of the iconostasis for the lower church of the Assumption of Our Lady of the Holy Dormition Monastery Mykolo-Vasylivsky Monastery, village Mykilske, Volnovakha district, Donetsk region

As honorary president of the association "Honor and Dignity", Volodymyr Malyshev helps families of deceased members of the police department.

Thanks to the efforts of Malyshev Novokremenetsk council and Novokremenetsk health posts were gasified, Novostepanivsk school received modern computer lab and Oleksandrivsk football team was equipped with ball park for lessons, stadium rostrum were rebuilt. The original museum in the village Nekremenne turned into a real treasure that reflects the culture and life of our ancestors.

Slov'yansk preschool orphanage for mentally retarded children is under his tutelage. He is making all the forces to ensure that the kids lived there as at home, needing nothing.

Volodymyr Stepanovych Malyshev provided extensive sponsorship in the development of the Donetsk Museum of photojournalism and photographic equipment. In addition, people's deputy of Ukraine, being a true fan of photography, who has visited many museums in Ukraine and abroad, gave useful tips on the concept of the museum, and they were considered by founders.

In July 2007 and May 2015 Malyshev financed the purchase of household appliances and equipment for Kyiv Theological Academy and Seminary.

In 2012-2013 Malyshev Volodymyr Stepanovych initiated, organized and financed the overhaul of children's pulmonology department of 3rd city hospital in Kalinin district, Donetsk. By this time, continues to provide the specified separation of necessary drugs.

In September 2015 Malyshev Volodymyr Stepanovych financed the purchase of household appliances, took the current economic expenses and purchased a dome for the church of St. Nicholas Ashram-Ryhlivsk monastery. Prior - archimandrite Guriy (Firov).

From April to October 2015 Malyshev initiates and organizes the creation and production of such publications:
 book-album "Kiev Theological Schools. 400 years. History in Photographs" 20 October 2015. Design and contemporary photographs - Sergiy Ryzhkov, photographer - Ivan Nakonechny, UDK 281.9:061.91(477-25)(084.12), BBK 86.372(4УКР-2К)ya6, Authors sign К38
 "Schema-archimandrite Zosima. Love above all." Author: V. Karagodin, 2008 Holy Dormition Nicholas Basil Monastery 
 Spiritual and educational publishing house of Holy Dormition Nicholas Basil Monastery, photo-album "To the bright memory of schema-archimandrite Alipiy" 2014 
 Photobook "Donetsk in faces." Information photo agency "Donpress" 
 Album "Stop a moment! Donbass in a focus". Author: Navrods'kyy G.L. The National Union of Writers of Ukraine, 2003

Awards

Orders 
 Third Class Order of Merit (Ukraine), 3 July 2001
 Second Class Order of Merit (Ukraine), 26 July 2010
 Second Class Order of venerable Ilya Muromets (2002)
 Second Class Order of venerable Nestor the Chronicler (2008)
 Second Class Order of St. Volodymyr (2010)
 Order of Our Lady of Pochayiv (2011)
 Order of the 1025th anniversary of the Baptism of Kievan Rus (2013)
 Order of the Ukrainian Orthodox Church of St. Petro Mohyla (11 November 2015)

Diplomas 
 Diploma of the Cabinet of Ministers of Ukraine (2002)
 Diploma of the Verkhovna Rada of Ukraine (2004)

Medals 
 «For a Honorable Service» III (1983), II (1988), I (1993)

Badges and insignias 
 Badge of honour of the Academy of the USSR Ministry (1991).
 Badge of honour of the MIA of Ukraine (2000).
Repeatedly he was awarded numerous medals and other decorations.

References 

1950 births
Fifth convocation members of the Verkhovna Rada
Living people
Party of Regions politicians
Politicians from Donetsk
Seventh convocation members of the Verkhovna Rada
Sixth convocation members of the Verkhovna Rada
Recipients of the Order of Prince Yaroslav the Wise, 2nd class
Laureates of the Honorary Diploma of the Verkhovna Rada of Ukraine
Recipients of the Honorary Diploma of the Cabinet of Ministers of Ukraine
Military personnel from Donetsk